Acanthodactylus schmidti, also known commonly as Schmidt's fringe-fingered lizard or Schmidt's fringe-toed lizard, is a species of lizard in the family Lacertidae. The species is endemic to Western Asia.

Etymology
The specific name, schmidti, is in honor of American herpetologist Karl Patterson Schmidt.

Geographic range
Acanthodactylus schmidti is found in Iran, Iraq, Jordan, Kuwait, Oman, Qatar, Saudi Arabia, and United Arab Emirates.

Habitat

Description
Acanthodactylus schmidti differs from all other species in the "cantoris group" by having the scales on the sides of the posterior dorsum larger than those in the middle of the dorsum.

Reproduction
Acanthodactylus schmidti is oviparous.

References

Further reading
Arnold EN (1980). "The Reptiles and Amphibians of Dhofar, Southern Arabia". Journal of Oman Studies. Special Report No. 2: 273–332. (Acanthodactylus schmidti, new status, p. 307).
Haas G (1957). "Some Amphibians and Reptiles from Arabia". Proceedings of the California Academy of Sciences 29 (3): 47–86. (Acanthodactylus cantoris schmidti, new subspecies, pp. 72–73).
Salvador, Alfredo (1982). "A revision of the lizards of the genus Acanthodactylus (Sauria: Lacertidae)". Bonner Zoologische Monographien (16): 1–167. (Acanthodactylus schmidti, pp. 146–151, Figures 98–102, Map 30). (in English, with an abstract in German)
Deichsel, GUNTRAM (2017-10-01). "Abstracts Presented at 16th National Perinatology Congress, 28th September - 1st October 2017, Bodrum, Turkey". Perinatal Journal. 25(Suppl.): S1–S38. doi:10.2399/prn.17.s001001. ISSN 1305–3124.
Sindaco, Roberto. (2008–2013). The reptiles of the Western Palearctic. Jeremčenko, Valery K., Venchi, Alberto., Grieco, Cristina. Latina: Edizioni Belvedere. pp. 176–180. . OCLC 234368380.
"Abstracts Presented at 16th National Perinatology Congress, 28th September - 1st October 2017, Bodrum, Turkey". Perinatal Journal. 25 (Suppl.): S1–S38. 2017-10-01. doi:10.2399/prn.17.s001001. ISSN 1305-3124.
Al-Sadoon, Mohammed K.; Paray, Bilal Ahmad; Al-Otaibi, Hamad S. (2016-09-01). "Survey of the reptilian fauna of the Kingdom of Saudi Arabia. V. The lizard fauna of Turaif region". Saudi Journal of Biological Sciences. 23 (5): 642–648. doi:10.1016/j.sjbs.2016.04.005. ISSN 1319-562X.
Arnold, E. N. (1941). The scientific results of the Oman flora and fauna survey: The reptiles and amphibians of Dhofar, southern Arabia (4th ed., Vol. 6). Chicago: Karl Patterson.
Cogălniceanu, Dan; Castilla, Aurora; Valdeon, Aitor; Gosa, Alberto; Jaidah, Noora Al; Alkuwary, Ali; Saifelnasr, Essam; Mas, Paloma; Richer, Renee; Hemaidi, Ahmad Amer Al (2014-01-23). "A preliminary report on the distribution of lizards in Qatar". ZooKeys. 373: 67–91. doi:10.3897/zookeys.373.5994. ISSN 1313-2970.
Mayhew, Wilbur W. (1971). "Reproduction in the Desert Lizard, Dipsosaurus dorsalis". Herpetologica. 27 (1): 57–77. ISSN 0018-0831.
Nagy, Kenneth A. (1973). "Behavior, Diet and Reproduction in a Desert Lizard, Sauromalus obesus". Copeia. 1973 (1): 93–102. doi:10.2307/1442363. ISSN 0045-8511.
"NASA - UV Exposure Has Increased Over the Last 30 Years, but Stabilized Since the Mid-1990s". www.nasa.gov. Retrieved 2020-04-28.
"Reptiles and Amphibians - Threats and Concerns (U.S. National Park Service)". www.nps.gov. Retrieved 2020-04-28.
Sindaco, Roberto. (2008–2013). The reptiles of the Western Palearctic. Jeremčenko, Valery K., Venchi, Alberto., Grieco, Cristina. Latina: Edizioni Belvedere. pp. 176–180. . OCLC 234368380.
Theodore Papenfuss (Museum of Vertebrate Zoology, University of California); Soheila Shafiei Bafti (GRA, SRLI Reptile Assessment); Ahmad Mohammed Mousa Disi (GRA, SRLI Reptile Assessment); Zuhair Amr (Jordan University of Science & Technology, Jordan); Saleh Behbehani (The Scientific Centre, Kuwait); Awad Al Johany (King Saud University, Riyadh; Abdulhadi Aloufi (Tabuk University, Saudi Arabia) (2008-12-14). "IUCN Red List of Threatened Species: Acanthodactylus schmidti". IUCN Red List of Threatened Species. Retrieved 2020-04-26.

Acanthodactylus
Reptiles described in 1957
Taxa named by Georg Haas